Milesia semiluctifera  is a species of hoverfly in the family Syrphidae.

Distribution
France.

References

Insects described in 1789
Eristalinae
Diptera of Europe